Barajas may refer to:

Barajas (Madrid), the district of Madrid in which the airport lies
Barajas (Madrid Metro), station along Line 8 of the Madrid Metro
Adolfo Suárez Madrid–Barajas Airport, principal airport of Madrid, Spain
Barajas (archaeological site), in Pénjamo, Guanajuato, Mexico
Rod Barajas (born 1975), American baseball player

See also
Castillo San Felipe de Barajas, in Cartagena de Indias